Pampas grass or pampas-grass is a common name which may refer to any of several similar-looking, tall-growing species of grass:

 Species of Cortaderia including:
 Cortaderia selloana and its selected cultivars
 Cortaderia jubata (Andean pampas grass, purple pampas grass)
 Erianthus ravennae (syn. Saccharum ravennae) (giant woolly-beard grass, hardy pampas grass, Ravenna grass, ekra)
 Miscanthus sinensis (Japanese pampas grass)